Krašov Transmitter is a facility for TV-broadcasting in Bezvěrov in the Karlovy Vary Region of the Czech Republic.

Description
The old mast, which had a triangular cross section, was anchored in 4 levels, which were situated 60 metres, 127.5 metres, 206.25 metres and 285 metres above ground. At this height there was also a cabin with rooms for measurements. On this there was in a height of 290.62 metres the antenna mast for TV broadcasting.

The new mast was built 1979 and 1981 after the old mast partially collapsed in 1979 (the rest was demolished using explosives), because of strong freezing temperatures and damage received on 25 August 1968 during the 1968 Warsaw Pact intervention. The mast is the second tallest structure in the Czech Republic.

See also
 List of masts
 List of tallest structures in the Czech Republic

Source of data fold old mast
 Turmbauwerke, Bauverlag GmbH, Wiesbaden (Deutschland), 1966

External links
 Krasov Transmission Mast (new), Bezverov - SkyscraperPage.com
 Krasov Transmission Mast (original), Bezverov - SkyscraperPage.com

Towers in the Czech Republic
Radio masts and towers in Europe